Bestuzhev, or Bestuzheva (feminine) is a Russian surname.  The Bestuzhev noble family was from the medieval Novgorod Republic and descended from boyars.

Notable people with the surname include:

Pyotr Bestuzhev-Ryumin (1664-1742), Russian statesman
Mikhail Petrovich Bestuzhev-Ryumin (1688-1760), Russian diplomat
Alexey Bestuzhev-Ryumin (1693-1766), Russian diplomat
Alexander Fedoseyevich Bestuzhev (1761-1810), Russian writer and state councilor
Alexander's sons (all members of the Decembrist revolt):
Nikolay Bestuzhev (1791-1855), Russian writer and portrait painter
Alexander Bestuzhev (1797-1837), Russian writer
Mikhail Bestuzhev (writer) (1800-1871), Russian writer
Pyotr Bestuzhev (officer) (1804-1840), Russian officer and memoirist
Pavel Bestuzhev (1808-1846), Russian officer
Mikhail Bestuzhev-Ryumin (1801-1826), Russian officer
Konstantin Bestuzhev-Ryumin (1829-1897), Russian historian

Russian-language surnames